Francisca Viveros Barradas, (born April 2, 1947) known professionally as Paquita la del Barrio ("Paquita From the Neighborhood") is a Mexican singer, songwriter, and actress. She is a Grammy nominated singer of rancheras and other Mexican genres.

Career
Paquita started her career in Mexico City in 1970. She performed at a local restaurant in Colonia Guerrero, where fans returned every week to listen to her music. It is here where she gained her stage name. Her big break came in 1986, where she performed in a Televisa show that exposed her to a bigger audience and led to a recording contract with CBS. Her songs usually take a stance against Mexico's sexist male culture. This has made her popular among female audiences. She is known for her often confrontational presence; her signature phrase, with which she often teases male spectators in her shows, is "¿Me estás oyendo, inútil?" ("Are you listening to me, you good-for-nothing?"). In the 2021 Billboard Music Awards, when Bad Bunny went to the stage to help her with mic, she told him Eres un inutil. In an interview with The Miami Herald Paquita said, "I am defending women. It is very important. I am a woman. I speak of my experiences." Her best-known song is "Rata de dos patas" (Eng: "Two-legged rat"), in which she compares an ex-lover to a variety of vermin and other untrustworthy animals. The song was included in her album by the same name. Many of Paquita's albums and songs are jukebox staples in Mexican clubs and cantinas. Paquita's influences stemmed from ranchera music and singers like Antonio Aguilar and Pedro Infante. Many admirers, particularly outside Mexico, also appreciate her for her camp value.

Paquita duets with singer Ricardo Arjona on "Ni Tu Ni Yo" on his album 5to Piso (2008). She also performed at the Premios Lo Nuestro and participated in the "Somos El Mundo" the Spanish version of "We Are The World." She was honored with the Trajectory Award at the Premio Lo Nuestro Awards (2016). She also received the Lifetime Achievement Award at the 2021 Billboard Latin Music Awards

Paquita la del Barrio has inspired a television series on Univision.  The series, Paquita la del Barrio, follows the fictional life story behind the Mexican singer. Paquita stated that it was difficult to watch a story of her life, but was pleased that her story was being told.

Nominations 
Her album Romeo Y Su Nieta earned her a nomination for the 56th Annual Grammy Awards (2013) under Best Regional Mexican Music Album (Including Tejano).

Personal life
She was born in Alto Lucero, Veracruz.
When she was fifteen years old she eloped with forty-four-year-old Miguel Magaña. Her marriage with Magaña lasted seven years, and she had two sons. Her first marriage ended when she discovered her husband was married to another woman and had a family. Her second marriage lasted 31 years, and ended with her husband's death in 2000.

Controversy
She was criticized by the LGBT community when she said in an interview, "It is better for orphans to die than to be adopted by a homosexual family." She then apologized to the LGBT community and did a special performance and a press conference in a gay club called Spartacus Disco.

Discography

 1982. Paquita La Del Barrio Y Sus Boleros Romanticos 
(originally on LP & Cassette; sometimes titled "...Y Sus Boleros Rancheros" on some CD editions)
 1988. Mi Renuncia 
(originally on LP and cassette; re-released in 1993 on CD as "Tres Veces Te Engañé)
 1990. Ando Tapada
 1992. Desquítate Conmigo
 1993. Te Voy A Recordar
 1993. Ni Un Cigarro
 1993. Invítame A Pecar
 1993. Bórrate
 1994. Acábame De Matar
 1995. Dicen Que Tú
 1997. Destapa Me
 1998. Me Saludas A La Tuya
 1999. Al Cuarto Vaso
 2000. Piérdeme El Respeto
 2000. El Club De Los Inútiles
 2000. Azul Celeste
 2001. Taco Placero
 2001. Duro Y Contra Ellos
 2002. Verdad Que Duele
 2002. Pa' Puras Vergüenzas
 2002. Falsaria
 2003. La Mera Chingona
 2004. Qué Mamá Tan Chaparrita
 2004. Para Los Inútiles
 2004. Me Estás Oyendo, Inútil?
 2004. Lámpara Sin Luz
 2004. La Crema De La Crema
 2004. Hombres Malvados
 2005. Qué Chulos Campos
 2005. No Me Amenaces
 2005. Mi Historia
 2005. Llorarás
 2005. En La Bohemia
 2006. El Estilo Inconfundible De Paquita La Del Barrio
 2006. 20 Éxitos
 2007. Puro Dolor
 2007. No Chifle Usted
 2008. Las Consentidas De Paquita La Del Barrio
 2008. Las Mujeres Mandan
 2008. Lo Nuevo De Paquita La Del Barrio
 2008. Rata De Dos Patas
 2015. La Leyenda Del Barrio

References

Ranchera singers
1947 births
Living people
Feminist musicians
Mexican feminists
Singers from Veracruz
20th-century Mexican women singers
21st-century Mexican women singers
Women in Latin music